Desulfocapsa thiozymogenes is an anaerobic, gram-negative bacterium. It disproportionates elemental sulfur. It is the type species of its genus.

References

Further reading

Canfield, Donald E., and Bo Thamdrup. Aquatic geomicrobiology. Gulf Professional Publishing, 2005.

External links

LPSN
Type strain of Desulfocapsa thiozymogenes at BacDive -  the Bacterial Diversity Metadatabase

Desulfobacterales
Bacteria described in 1997